Metcalfe Street (officially in ) is a north–south street located in downtown Montreal, Quebec, Canada. It links Sherbrooke Street in the north and René Lévesque Boulevard in the south. It is best known for being the street on which the Sun Life Building (1155 Metcalfe Street), Mary, Queen of the World Cathedral (formerly known as Saint James Cathedral), and other notable buildings are located. South of René Lévesque Boulevard, the street is known as Cathedral Street (French: rue de la Cathédrale). The street borders the eastern side of both Dorchester Square and Place du Canada, to the south.

History
Opened in the mid 19th century, the street owes its name to Charles Metcalfe, 1st Baron Metcalfe (1785–1846), the 16th Governor General of Canada.

References

 Rémillard, François, Old Montreal - A Walking Tour, Ministère des Affaires culturelles du Québec, 1992

Streets in Montreal
Downtown Montreal